Place Vendôme (released as Encounter in the U.S.) is an album released by the Swingle Singers performing with the Modern Jazz Quartet.  The album was a 1967 Grammy award nominee.

All tracks from this album are also included on the Mercury compilation CD Compact Jazz: The Swingle Singers and the 11 disk Philips boxed set, Swingle Singers.

Track listing
"Sascha" (Little David's Fugue) (John Lewis) – 4:18
"Orchestral Suite No. 3 in D major," (aka "Air on the G String") BWV 1068 (J. S. Bach) – 5:41
"Vendôme" (Lewis) – 3:32
"The Musical Offering" (Musikalisches Opfer), for keyboard and chamber instruments, BWV 1079 (Bach) – 6:34
"When I am Laid in Earth" (from Dido and Aeneas), soprano aria ("Dido's Lament") (Henry Purcell) – 5:05
"Alexander's Fugue" (Lewis) – 4:53
"Three Windows" (Lewis) – 7:10

Personnel
The Swingle Singers:
Jeanette Baucomont – soprano
Christiane Legrand – soprano
Alice Herald – alto
Claudine Meunier – alto
Ward Swingle – tenor, arranger
Claude Germain – tenor
Jean Cussac – bass
José Germain – bass
The Modern Jazz Quartet:
John Lewis – piano
Milt Jackson – vibraphone
Percy Heath – double bass
Connie Kay – drums

References / external links
Philips PHM 200-225 (Mono LP) / Philips PHS 600-225 (Stereo LP)
Place Vendome at [ allmusic.com]

The Swingle Singers albums
Modern Jazz Quartet albums
1966 albums
Collaborative albums
Philips Records albums